Högsby is a locality and the seat of Högsby Municipality, Kalmar County, Sweden with 1,881 inhabitants in 2010.
Other towns in the Högsby Municipality are Långemåla, Fågelfors, Berga and Fagerhult, of which Långemåla is probably the smallest.

Högsby Tätort 
The town of Högsby is the seat of the Högsby Municipality, which itself is part of Kalmar County. The town has a local mall Karlsson Varuhus, located closely with other local shops and businesses such as a thai restaurant (Bhann Thai ), a second hand shop, a café, and a local gym.
Högsby also has one ICA supermarket, one COOP Konsum supermarket and a few local pizzerias. In the center of the town there is another second hand shop, Kupan, which is part of the Red Cross

Sights 
Högsby has the river Emån running through the town, which is commonly used for canoeing and fishing. A museum about the actress Greta Garbo, opened in 1998, is located in the center of Högsby. This is in large due to that her mother originated from Högsby. Bokhultet is a 
nature reserve located outside Högsby; it has a significant number of rare plants and insects.

Education 
Högsby is also home of Högsby Educational Centre (Högsby Utbildningscenter), commonly referred to as HUC. It's a small school, with less than 160 pupils, all between 16 and 19 years old. HUC is a so-called "Gymnasium" which in British and American school systems would be something in the middle between High School and College.

References 

Municipal seats of Kalmar County
Swedish municipal seats
Populated places in Kalmar County
Populated places in Högsby Municipality